Quinn Bradlee FRSA FRAS FSA Scot (aged ) is an American filmmaker, author and advocate for improving the lives of disabled individuals.

Biography
Bradlee is the son of the late author and Washington Post executive editor Ben Bradlee, and author and journalist Sally Quinn.

He was diagnosed in 1996 with DiGeorge syndrome. He attended The Lab School of Washington, and graduated from the college-preparatory Gow School in 2002. He attended special programs at Landmark College and American University, and studied at the New York Film Academy.

He is the producer of several documentary films including the 2007 film Life with VCFS about the syndrome and the VCFS International Center at Upstate Medical University, and is the associate producer of the 2010 HBO Family documentary film I Can't Do This But I CAN Do That: A Film for Families About Learning Differences. He is the author of the 2009 memoir A Different Life: Growing Up Learning Disabled and Other Adventures, documenting his efforts to overcome VCFS, and, with his father, he co-authored the 2012 book A Life's Work: Fathers and Sons.

He is the webmaster of Friends of Quinn, a website which he created in 2008 as part of the HealthCentral Network for learning disabled individuals. It offers "resources and support for young adults with learning differences," and uses the dyslexic-friendly Dyslexie font to mitigate some of the issues that dyslexics experience when reading. As part of a series of website-video interviews with notable individuals, he interviewed filmmaker Steven Spielberg. In the interview, Spielberg described his own lifelong dyslexia and 2007 diagnosis of the developmental reading disorder. Bradlee is also the youth engagement associate for the National Center for Learning Disabilities.

He married yoga instructor Pary Anbaz-Williamson in 2010. The couple divorced in 2014.

Filmography

Books

References

1982 births
American filmmakers
American non-fiction writers
American University alumni
American disability rights activists
Living people
New York Film Academy alumni
Writers from Washington, D.C.
Fellows of the Society of Antiquaries of Scotland
People from Georgetown (Washington, D.C.)